Altandi railway station is located on the Beenleigh line in Queensland, Australia. It is one of three stations serving the Brisbane suburb of Sunnybank, the others being Sunnybank and Banoon.

In 2008, an upgrade of the station was completed as part of the Salisbury to Kuraby triplication project. This included converting the eastern platform to an island, and a new footbridge with lifts.

History
A siding was lobbied for in the 1930s by the Runcorn Progress Association.  A platform was first built at Altandi in 1933.  It was officially named on  13 July 1934.  The name was chosen based on an Aboriginal word for gum trees found in the area.

Services
Altandi is served by all stops Beenleigh line services from Beenleigh and Kuraby to Bowen Hills and Ferny Grove.
It is also served by limited stops Gold Coast line services from Varsity Lakes to Bowen Hills, Doomben and Brisbane Airport Domestic.

Services by platform

References

External links

Altandi station Queensland's Railways on the Internet
[ Altandi station] TransLink travel information

Railway stations in Brisbane